The Progress Tag Team Championship is a professional wrestling championship created and promoted by the British professional wrestling promotion Progress Wrestling. Introduced on 24 November 2013, the inaugural championship team was FSU (Mark Andrews and Eddie Dennis). The current champions are Sunshine Machine (Chuck Mambo and TK Cooper), who are in their first reign.

History 
It was announced at Chapter 9 that beginning in November 2013 there would begin a series of matches to determine the first Progress Tag Team champions. The champions were crowned at Chapter 12, the second anniversary show, in March 2014. As with the Progress Championship not being a conventional championship belt, the Progress Tag Team Championship was originally represented by a shield with the Progress eagle on the front. The shield splits into two, one for each championship holder.

At Chapter 46 the Tag Team shields were replaced with traditional strap title belts, with the design on the front plate of each belt representing the defunct Tag shields.

Reigns
The inaugural champions were the FSU (Mark Andrews and Eddie Dennis).

The current champions are Sunshine Machine (Chuck Mambo and TK Cooper), who are in their first reign. They defeated previous champion The 0121 (Dan Moloney & Man Like DeReiss) and The Smokin' Aces (Charlie Sterling & Nick Riley) in a three-way match on 4 June 2022 on Chapter 135: Super Strong Style 16 Tournament in London, England.

Combined reigns 

By team

By wrestler

References

External links 
 Progress Wrestling Tag Team Title History at Cagematch.net

Progress Wrestling championships
Tag team wrestling championships